Ethinylestradiol/megestrol acetate (EE/MGA), sold under the brand name Volidan among others, was a combination of ethinylestradiol (EE), an estrogen, and megestrol acetate (MGA), a progestin, which was used as a birth control pill to prevent pregnancy in women. It was taken by mouth and contained 50 to 100 μg EE and 1 to 5 mg MGA per tablet. MGA-containing birth control pills were withdrawn after reports in the early 1970s of a high incidence of venous thromboembolism in association with the preparations.

See also
 List of combined sex-hormonal preparations § Estrogens and progestogens

References

Abandoned drugs
Combined oral contraceptives